Gunthwaite and Ingbirchworth is a civil parish in the metropolitan borough of Barnsley, South Yorkshire, England.  The parish contains 23 listed buildings that are recorded in the National Heritage List for England.  Of these, one is listed at Grade I, the highest of the three grades, two are at Grade II*, the middle grade, and the others are at Grade II, the lowest grade.  The parish contains the village of Ingbirchworth and the smaller settlement of Gunthwaite, and is otherwise rural.  Most of the listed buildings are farmhouses and farm buildings, the farm buildings including Gunthwaite Hall Barn, which is described by Pevsner as "one of the finest in the country".  The other listed buildings are houses and associated structures, and a water mill.


Key

Buildings

References

Citations

Sources

 

Lists of listed buildings in South Yorkshire
Buildings and structures in the Metropolitan Borough of Barnsley